Rana may refer to the following varieties:

Rana Tharu, an Indo-Aryan language of India and Nepal
Rana, a dialect of Kutang, a Sino-Tibetan language of Nepal
 Rana, a dialect of Buru, an Austronesian language of Indonesia